Jorge Iván Solís Pérez (born 23 October 1979) is a Mexican former professional boxer. He is a former holder of various minor and regional titles including, the Jalisco State Featherweight title, WBC Latin America title, Mexican Super Bantamweight and Featherweight divisions and WBA Fedecentro titles. He's also the brother of former IBF Champion Ulises Solís.

Professional career
Solís started his professional boxing career in 1998 at 112 pounds at the age of 19. His early fights usually took place in Mexico. His first professional fight was a four-round bout against Bernardo Tule (2-1-0) on February 6, 1998, which Solís won via technical knockout (TKO).

His first fight in the United States was against Juan Jose Mendez (3-2-1) on September 2, 2000 in the Don Haskins Center, El Paso, Texas, which he won in the 6th round by technical knockout.

On October 27, 2001 Solís faced Ruben Estanislao (13-3-1) for the Mexican Super Bantamweight Championship, which he won and defended it against Jorge Munoz (22-17-2), Sammy Ventura (17-8-0) and Fernando Alanis (16-14-3).

On June 6, 2003 Solis faced Wilson Alcorro (20-4-2) for the WBC Latin America Super Featherweight Title but the bout ended in a draw.

In September 2004, Solis fought future champion Humberto Soto (35-5-2) in a bout which resulted in a "no contest" decision. Solis was knocked to the canvas by Soto in the third round, but the fight was stopped later in the round after Solis suffered a cut due to an accidental clash of heads. Humberto Soto, who was ahead on all scorecards, disputed the outcome claiming that the cut was the result of a punch and not a head clash.

Solis vs Pacquiao 
On April 14, 2007, Solis faced off against reigning WBC International Super-Featherweight champion, then three-division world champion Manny Pacquiao (43-3-2) in San Antonio, Texas. Solis provided a tougher challenge than expected, however, Pacquiao proved too much for the number four ranked challenger. Pacquiao unleashed a barrage of lethal punches to knock out the unbeaten Solis in the eighth round. In the Philippines, this match was called as The Blaze of Glory.

After being beaten by Pacquiao, Jorge defeated Santiago Allione (13-4-0) at the Arena Coliseo in Guadalajara by technical knockout. On January 31, 2009 in Zapopan, Jalisco, Solís scored a fifth-round technical knockout of Monty Meza Clay (28-1-0) in an IBF title eliminator.

Solis vs Cruz 
On July 11, 2009, Solis challenged IBF featherweight champion Cristobal Cruz (38-11-1), whom Solis had previously defeated, but lost by unanimous decision. During the bout, Solis was docked 4 points for intentional low blows while Cruz was docked two points for headbutting. The final scores were 113-110, 113-110, and 113-111 in favor of Cruz. Solis moved up to the Super Featherweight division in his next bout and defeated Likar Ramos by 7th-round TKO to claim the WBA interim Super featherweight title.

On May 8, 2010, Solis defended his interim title against Mario Santiago by a wide unanimous decision on the under-card of Latin Fury 14.

Gamboa vs Solis 

On March 26, 2011, Solis got a chance to take on the Unified WBA World and IBF Featherweight Champion Yuriorkis Gamboa (19-0, 15 KO's). Solis was completely and utterly dominated by Gamboa and was knocked out in the fourth round in what was a dazzling display of boxing skills from Gamboa.

Professional boxing record

| style="text-align:center;" colspan="8"|40 Wins (27 Knockouts), 4 Losses (3 Knockouts),  2 Draws 1 No Contest
|-  style="text-align:center; background:#e3e3e3;"
|  style="border-style:none none solid solid; "|Res.
|  style="border-style:none none solid solid; "|Record
|  style="border-style:none none solid solid; "|Opponent
|  style="border-style:none none solid solid; "|Type
|  style="border-style:none none solid solid; "|Rd., Time
|  style="border-style:none none solid solid; "|Date
|  style="border-style:none none solid solid; "|Location
|  style="border-style:none none solid solid; "|Notes
|- align=center
|Loss 
|40-4-2 
|align=left| Takashi Uchiyama
|
|
|
|align=left|
|align=left|
|- align=center
|Loss 
|40-3-2 
|align=left| Yuriorkis Gamboa
|
|
|
|align=left|
|align=left|
|- align=center
|Win
|40-2-2 
|align=left| Francisco Cordero
|
|
|
|align=left|
|align=left|
|- align=center
|Win
|39-2-2 
|align=left| Mario Santiago
|
|
|
|align=left|
|align=left|
|- align=center
|Win
|38-2-2 
|align=left| Likar Ramos
|
|
|
|align=left|
|align=left|
|- align=center
|Loss
|37-2-2 
|align=left| Cristóbal Cruz
|
|
|
|align=left|
|align=left|
|- align=center
|Win
|37-1-2 
|align=left| Monty Meza Clay
|
|
|
|align=left|
|align=left|
|- align=center
|Win
|36-1-2 
|align=left| Jorge Samudio
|
|
|
|align=left|
|align=left|
|- align=center
|Win
|35-1-2 
|align=left| Miguel Roman
|
|
|
|align=left|
|align=left|
|- align=center
|Win
|34-1-2 
|align=left| Santiago Allione	
|
|
|
|align=left|
|align=left|
|- align=center
|Loss
|33-1-2 
|align=left| Manny Pacquiao
|
|
|
|align=left|
|align=left|
|- align=center
|Win
|33-0-2 
|align=left| Fernando Omar Lizarraga
|
|
|
|align=left|
|align=left|
|- align=center
|Win
|32-0-2 
|align=left| Lizardo Moreno
|
|
|
|align=left|
|align=left|
|- align=center
|Win
|31-0-2 
|align=left| Adalberto Borquez
|
|
|
|align=left|
|align=left|
|- align=center
|Win
|30-0-2 
|align=left| Hector Javier Marquez
|
|
|
|align=left|
|align=left|

Pay-per-view bouts

See also
Notable boxing families

References

External links 
 

1979 births
Bantamweight boxers
Featherweight boxers
Living people
Boxers from Jalisco
Sportspeople from Guadalajara, Jalisco
Super-bantamweight boxers
Super-featherweight boxers
Mexican male boxers